Fig Rig is a handheld stabilization device for smaller film cameras/video cameras designed by film director Mike Figgis. The Fig Rig is made commercially by the Manfrotto Group.

External links 
 
 build your own

Film and video technology
Film and video terminology